Richard Glesmann (born June 15, 1978) is an American basketball  head coach for the Ibaraki Robots of the Japanese B.League.

Head coaching record

|-
| style="text-align:left;"|Ehime Orange Vikings
| style="text-align:left;"|2017–18
| 60||33||27|||| style="text-align:center;"|4th in B2 Western|||-||-||-||
| style="text-align:center;"|-
|-
| style="text-align:left;"|Ehime Orange Vikings
| style="text-align:left;"|2018–19
| 60||20||40|||| style="text-align:center;"|5th in B2 Western|||-||-||-||
| style="text-align:center;"|-
|-

References

External links

1974 births
Living people
American men's basketball coaches
American men's basketball players
Basketball coaches from Massachusetts
Basketball players from Massachusetts
Ehime Orange Vikings coaches
Emerson Lions men's basketball players
People from Wayland, Massachusetts
Sportspeople from Middlesex County, Massachusetts